Field hockey was among the sports contested at the 2022 Commonwealth Games, held in Birmingham, England. This was the seventh staging of hockey at the Commonwealth Games since its debut in 1998, and the second staging within England specifically.

The tournaments took place between 29 July and 8 August 2022.

Schedule
The competition schedule was as follows:

Detailed fixtures were released on 9 March 2022.

Venue
The tournaments were held at the University of Birmingham Hockey and Squash Centre, where the squash competition  also took place.

Qualification
Ten nations from at least four CGF regions qualified for each tournament at the 2022 Commonwealth Games:

 The host nation.
 The defending champions (unless already qualified as host country).
 The highest-ranked nations in the FIH World Rankings as of 1 February 2022, excluding those already qualified.

Men

Women

;Scheduling issues

Men's tournament

Group stage

Pool A

Pool B

Medal round

Women's tournament

Group stage

Pool A

Pool B

Medal round

Medal summary

Medal table

Medalists

References

External links
 Official website: 2022 Commonwealth Games – Hockey

 
2022
2022 Commonwealth Games events
Commonwealth Games
2022 Commonwealth Games